The New Hampshire Department of Administrative Services (DAS) is a state agency of the U.S. state of New Hampshire, headquartered in Concord. The department provides statewide management services for the New Hampshire state government. The department also prepares the Annual Comprehensive Financial Report (ACFR) for the state. The department is authorized as provided in New Hampshire Revised Statutes Annotated (NH RSA) Chapter 21-I.

Organization
The department is organized into several divisions:
 Division of Financial Data Management
 Division of Public Works Design & Construction
 Division of Plant & Property Management
 Division of Accounting Services
 Division of Risk & Benefits
 Division of Personnel
 Division of Procurement & Support Services

There are also several administrative functions, including the State Budget Unit and the Cost Containment Unit.

References

External links

Administrative Services
1931 establishments in New Hampshire
Government agencies established in 1931